Joseph Sigelman (born February 6, 1971) is an American businessman. He is a co-founder of AG&P Group and ex-CEO of OfficeTiger.

Early life and education
Joseph Sigelman was born on February 6, 1971, in New York City in the United States. He is a graduate of Princeton University's Woodrow Wilson School of Public and International Affairs, and he went on to receive his MBA from Harvard Business School, during which time he worked as a summer intern at Goldman Sachs in London. Sigelman is married to wife, Ayesha, and has two children, Maya Jessica and Daniel Cyrus, who were both born in the Philippines.

Career
Sigelman started his career in investment banking with Lazard Frères & Co. and later worked in private equity at the London Offices of Goldman Sachs, where he had summer interned during his studies. In 1999, he along with friend and business partner Randy Altschuler who was his classmate at Princeton University, started their first business called OfficeTiger.

Early career 
In 2004, the company had over 2,000 employees and operated in both the US and the UK. In 2006 the company was arguably one of the first businesses worldwide to enter the business process outsourcing space in India and closed a US$250 million cash sale to RR Donnelley & Sons. 

Sigelman further expanded the business operations, with the opening of a new company PetroTiger Ltd, a British Virgin Islands oil and gas company with operations in Colombia and offices in New Jersey.

In 2013, legal proceedings against Sigelman in relation to dealings between PetroTiger and Columbian Officials were in violation of the Foreign Corrupt Practices Act. Proceedings were concluded in 2015, with Sigelman being fined $100,000. The Judge, Judge Joseph Irenas, criticized the prosecutors of the case, saying he felt he was "being played with" after the prosecution decided "not to complete the trial". Irenas also pointed out that Sigelman has proven his ability to do great good in relation to the work he was doing in developing nations like Columbia.  Bloomberg financial news also questioned the prosecution of Sigelman, suggesting he may have been a "Mark" for others involved.

Atlantic Gulf & Pacific  
In 2010, along with a group of shareholders, Sigelman led the acquisition of Philippines-based business, Atlantic Gulf & Pacific (AG&P Group). AG&P is a major construction and engineering company based in the Philippines which was acquired in 2010 and reoriented to be an LNG import, and distribution company.

Since the acquisition of AG&P in 2010, Sigelman has led the growth of over US$300 million in equity infusions and the expansion of the company across the Asia Pacific region, including the acquisition of Korean gas giant, Gas Entec.

Sigelman was a World Economic Forum Young Global Leader, a Businessweek Star of Asia, and Asia CEO Expat Executive of the Year.  Joe is a life member of the Council on Foreign Relations.

References

External links
 

1971 births
Living people
Businesspeople from New York City
Harvard Business School alumni
Princeton University alumni
American expatriates in the Philippines
20th-century American businesspeople
21st-century American businesspeople